Minuteman for the Moment is the second studio album by Look What I Did, released on October 4, 2005 via Combat Records/Koch Records. It features an updated version of the song "Cupid Full of Eros" previously seen on the band's 2003 album My First Time, as well as the second song in the "Zanzibar" chapter also seen on the band's previous release.

Track listing
"Minuteman for the Moment" (3:07)
"Ultimate Complete Home Fitness Machine" (3:18)
"The Soiree" (5:13)
"The FOX Eats TV Ishmael" (4:39)
"Raining Pleasantries" (3:53)
"Appomattox Whorehouse" (3:35)
"Benevolesaurus Lex" (4:09)
"Chest Is a Ribcage "(4:27)
"Lightning Bugs" (4:21)
"Cupid Full of Eros" (3:06)
"Is, Was, and Will Be" (4:50)
"Zanzibar II: Sasha and Sebastian" (7:24)

Credits
Paul Romano - artwork
Brian Virtue - producer, mixing, engineer
Chris Bradley - vocal production, bass performance
Barry Donegan - vocals
Colby Shea - guitars
Miles McPherson - drums
Aaron Childress - guitars

Look What I Did albums
2005 albums